Ruth Ford (July 7, 1911 – August 12, 2009) was an American actress and model. Her brother was the bohemian surrealist Charles Henri Ford. Their parents owned or managed hotels in the American South, and the family regularly moved.

Life and career
Born in Brookhaven, Mississippi, Ford was the daughter of Charles and Gertrude Cato Ford, who owned hotels in four towns in the South. She was a graduate of the University of Mississippi. Writer and artist Charles Henri Ford was her brother.

As a model, Ford posed for photographers Cecil Beaton, Man Ray, and Carl Van Vechten, among others.

She married actor Peter Van Eyck in 1940, but the marriage was unsuccessful. Van Eyck was the father of her daughter, Shelley, who was born in 1941. Before Ford's trip to Hollywood, she was a member of Orson Welles' Mercury Theatre, and appeared in his film Too Much Johnson (1938), which was considered lost until the rediscovery of footage in 2013. Welles's assistance helped her to land contracts with Columbia Pictures and Warner Bros. studios. 

Ford's Broadway debut was in The Shoemaker's Holiday (1938). Among her other Broadway performances, she starred in Poor Murderer (1976).

Ford married film star Zachary Scott, and they remained together until Scott's death in 1965. Scott adopted Shelley, who took the name Shelley Scott. Zachary Scott reportedly died penniless except for a $100,000 insurance policy he left for his widow.  Later, in the 1970s, she was involved in a relationship with a much younger man, the writer Dotson Rader.

Ford, writing out Christmas cards by her courtyard window was the first person to call 911 to report shots fired at The Dakota apartments which would turn out to be the murder of John Lennon.
 
Ford died in New York City.

Posthumous
In May 2010 it was reported, originally in The Wall Street Journal, that Ford's estate had been worth $8.4 million, almost all of it in the value of two apartments she owned in the apartment building The Dakota in Manhattan, where she died at the age of 98 in 2009. One of the apartments had belonged to her brother Charles, who predeceased her. She bequeathed the apartments to her cook/butler, Indra Tamang, a Nepalese-American whom Charles Henri Ford had brought to New York. Ford's daughter and grandchildren reportedly were disinherited. Tamang sold the larger of Ford's Dakota apartments in 2011 for less than $4.5 million.

Partial filmography

 Chloe, Love Is Calling You (1934) – Minor Role (uncredited)
 Too Much Johnson (1938) – Mrs. Billings
 Roaring Frontiers (1941) – Reba Bailey
 Secrets of the Lone Wolf (1941) – Helene de Leon
 The Man Who Returned to Life (1942) – Beth Beebe
 The Lady Is Willing (1942) – Myrtle Glossamer
 Lady Gangster (1942) – Lucy Fenton
 Murder in the Big House (1942) – Mrs. Irene Gordon
 In This Our Life (1942) – Mother of Accident Victim (uncredited)
 Escape from Crime (1942) – Myrt
 Secret Enemies (1942) – Miss Page (uncredited)
 Across the Pacific (1942) – Secretary (uncredited)
 The Hidden Hand (1942) – Estelle Channing
 The Gorilla Man (1943) – Janet Devon
 Truck Busters (1943) – Pearl
 Air Force (1943) – Nurse (uncredited)
 Murder on the Waterfront (1943) – Lana Shane
 Adventure in Iraq (1943) – Tess Torrence
 Princess O'Rourke (1943) – Clare Stillwell (uncredited)
 Wilson (1944) – Margaret Wilson
 The Keys of the Kingdom (1944) – Sister Clotilde
 Circumstantial Evidence (1945) – Mrs. Simms
 The Woman Who Came Back (1945) – Ruth Gibson
 Strange Impersonation (1946) – Jane Karaski #1
 Dragonwyck (1946) – Cornelia Van Borden (uncredited)
 Act One (1963) – Beatrice Kaufman
 The Tree (1969) – Mrs. Gagnon
 Play It As It Lays (1972) – Carlotta
 Too Scared to Scream (1985) – Irma (final film role)

References

External links

Ruth Ford at Turner Classic Movies

 Ruth Ford's obituary in The Daily Telegraph
 Ruth Ford's obituary in The Times
 "I leave it all to my butler – the dying wish of reclusive star"
 Ruth Ford Papers. Yale Collection of American Literature, Beinecke Rare Book and Manuscript Library.

Actresses from Mississippi
Female models from Mississippi
American film actresses
American stage actresses
People from Brookhaven, Mississippi
People from Clarksville, Tennessee
1911 births
2009 deaths
20th-century American actresses
21st-century American women